Sergei Vasilyevich Marushko (born 24 May 1966) is a Russian professional football official and a former player and referee. He is the president of the Samara Football Federation.

Club career
He made his professional debut in the Soviet First League in 1983 for FC Kuban Krasnodar.

Post-playing career
After his retirement until 2007 he worked as a referee.

References

1966 births
People from Kanevskoy District
Living people
Soviet footballers
Russian footballers
Association football midfielders
FC Kuban Krasnodar players
FC SKA Rostov-on-Don players
PFC Krylia Sovetov Samara players
FC Lada-Tolyatti players
Russian Premier League players
Russian expatriate footballers
Expatriate footballers in Finland
Russian football referees